Love Is a Headache is a 1938 American comedy film directed by Richard Thorpe and written by Marion Parsonnet, Harry Ruskin and William R. Lipman. The film stars Gladys George, Franchot Tone, Ted Healy, Mickey Rooney, Frank Jenks and Ralph Morgan. The film was released on January 14, 1938, by Metro-Goldwyn-Mayer.

Plot
Carlotta Lee is a famed actress whose career is not doing so well. In the hopes of saving her career, her manager convinces her to adopt two orphan children.

Cast

References

External links 

 
 
 
 

1938 films
1930s English-language films
American comedy films
1938 comedy films
Metro-Goldwyn-Mayer films
Films directed by Richard Thorpe
American black-and-white films
Films scored by Edward Ward (composer)
1930s American films